John Stubbe may refer to:

 John Stubbs or Stubbe, pamphleteer
John Stubbe (MP) for Great Yarmouth (UK Parliament constituency)